Niihau, anglicized as Niihau, is the westernmost main and seventh largest inhabited island in Hawaii. Several intermittent playa lakes provide wetland habitats for the Hawaiian coot, the Hawaiian stilt, and the Hawaiian duck. The island is designated as critical habitat for Brighamia insignis, an endemic and endangered species of Hawaiian lobelioid. The United States Census Bureau defines Niihau and the neighboring island and State Seabird Sanctuary of Lehua as Census Tract 410 of Kauai County, Hawaii. Its 2000 census population was 160, most of whom are native Hawaiians; Its 2010 census population was 170. At the  2020 census, the population had fallen to 84.

The island's private ownership passed on to her descendants, the Robinsons. During World War II, the island was the site of the Niihau incident, in which, following the attack on Pearl Harbor, a Japanese navy fighter pilot crashed on the island and received help from the island's residents of Japanese descent.

The island, known as "the Forbidden Isle", is off-limits to all outsiders except the Robinson family and their relatives, U.S. Navy personnel, government officials, and invited guests. From 1987 onward, a limited number of supervised activity tours and hunting safaris have opened to tourists. The island is currently managed by brothers Bruce and Keith Robinson. The people of Niihau are noted for their gemlike lei pūpū (shell lei) craftsmanship. They speak Hawaiian as a primary language.

Geography

Niihau's dimensions are 6.2 miles by 18.6 miles (10 km × 30 km). The island is about 6 million years old, making it geologically older than the 5.8-million-year-old neighboring island of Kauai to the northeast. Niihau is the remnant of the southwestern slope of what was once a much larger volcano. The entire summit and other slopes collapsed into the ocean in a giant prehistoric landslide.

Climate
The island is relatively arid because it lies in the rain shadow of Kauai and lacks the elevation needed to catch significant amounts of trade wind rainfall. Niihau, therefore, depends on winter Kona storms for its rain, when more northerly weather systems intrude into the region. As such, the island is subject to long periods of drought. Historical droughts on Niihau have been recorded several times, one in 1792 by Captain James Cook's former junior officer, George Vancouver, who had been told that the people of Niihau had abandoned the island because of a severe drought and had moved to Kauai to escape famine.

Flora and fauna

As an arid island, Niihau was barren of trees for centuries – Captain James Cook reported it treeless in 1778. Aubrey Robinson, grandfather of current owners Bruce Robinson and Keith Robinson, planted 10,000 trees per year during much of his ownership of the island; Robinson's afforestation efforts increased rainfall in the dry climate. Island co-owner Keith Robinson, a noted conservationist, preserved and documented many of Niihau's natural plant resources. The island is designated as a critical habitat for the ōlulu, an endemic and endangered species of Hawaiian lobelioid. Pritchardia aylmer-robinsonii, a palm tree named for Keith Robinson's uncle Aylmer Robinson, is an endangered species native to Niihau.

Several bird species thrive on Niʻihau. The largest lakes on the island are Hālaliʻi Lake, Halulu Lake and Nonopapa Lake. These intermittent playa lakes on the island provide wetland habitats for the ʻalae keʻokeʻo (Hawaiian coot), the āeʻo (Hawaiian subspecies of Black-necked Stilt), and the koloa maoli (Hawaiian duck). The critically endangered Hawaiian monk seal (Monachus schauinslandi) is found in high numbers on Niʻihau's shores. Robinson states that Niʻihau's secluded shoreline offers them a safe haven from habitat encroachments. According to Robinson, conditions there are better than the government refuges of the Northwestern Hawaiian Islands. When the Robinsons originally purchased Niʻihau, no monk seals were present, because they lived in the northwestern part of the Hawaiian island chain, Necker and Midway islands. They have been relocated to the main Hawaiian island chain by NOAA fisheries over the past thirty years, and some have found homes on Niʻihau.

Big game herds, imported from stock on Molokai Ranch in recent years, roam Niihau's forests and flatlands. Eland and aoudad are abundant, along with oryxes, wild boars and feral sheep. These big game herds provide income from hunting safari tourism.

History

Kahelelani was the first of the Niihau alii. His name is now used to refer to the Niihau kahelelani, the puka shell of the wart turbans (Leptothyra verruca), used to make exquisite Niihau shell jewelry. Kāʻeokūlani was a ruler of northern Niihau who unified the island after defeating his rival, a chief named Kawaihoa. A stone wall across a quarter of the island's southern end marked the boundaries of the two chiefs: Kāeo's land was identified by black stones and Kawaihoa's by white stones. Eventually, a great battle took place, known as Pali Kamakaui. Kāeo's two brothers from the island of Maui, Kaʻiana and his half-brother Kahekili II, the King of Maui, fought for Kāeo, and Niihau was united under his rule. Kawaihoa was banished to the south end of the island and Kāeo moved to the middle of the island to govern. Kāeo married the Queen Kamakahelei, and a future king of Niihau and Kauai named Kaumualii was born in 1790. Kauai and Niihau are said to have carried the "highest blood lines" in the Hawaiian Islands.

Kamehameha managed to unify all of the islands by 1795, except for Kauai and Niihau. Two attempts to conquer those islands had failed, and Kamehameha lost many men: bodies covered the beaches on Kauai's eastern shores. Finally, in 1810, Kamehameha amassed a great fleet, and Kaumualii, the last independent , surrendered rather than risk further bloodshed. Independence again became feasible after Kamehameha's death in 1819, but was put down when Kamehameha's widow Kaʻahumanu kidnapped Kaumualii and forced him to marry her. Thereafter Niihau remained part of the unified Hawaiian Kingdom.

Sinclair chose Niihau over other options, including Waikīkī and Pearl Harbor. By around 1875, Niihau's population consisted of about 350 Native Hawaiians, with 20,000 sheep. This era marked the end of the art of Hawaiian mat-weaving made famous by the people of Niihau. (Cyperus laevigatus), a native sedge, used to grow on the edges of Niihau's three intermittent lakes. The stems were harvested and used to weave  (mats), considered the "finest sleeping mats in Polynesia".

In 1915, Sinclair's grandson Aubrey Robinson closed the island to most visitors. Even relatives of the inhabitants could visit only by special permission. Upon Aubrey's death in 1939 the island passed to his son Aylmer, and in 1968 to Aylmer's youngest brother Lester. Upon Lester's wife Helen's death, the island passed to his sons Bruce Robinson and Keith Robinson, the current co-owners. (See Sinclair-Robinson family tree)

Niihau played a small role during the attack on Pearl Harbor on December 7, 1941. In what has come to be called the Niihau Incident (or the Battle of Niihau), a Japanese pilot whose Zero had been hit crash-landed on the island hoping to rendezvous with a rescue submarine. The pilot was apprehended and later escaped with the assistance of local Japanese residents, but he was killed shortly afterwards.

Despite its self-imposed isolation, Niihau has a long-standing relationship with the U.S. military dating from 1924. There is a small Navy installation on the island. No military personnel are permanently stationed there, but the U.S. military has used the island for training special operations units, which included hiring Hawaiians who live on Niihau as "enemy" trackers.

Society

Politics

The island of Niihau was considered as a possible location for the United Nations headquarters in 1944 by Franklin D. Roosevelt, who had visited Hawaii in 1934. Under Cordell Hull, Roosevelt's Secretary of State, the State Department seriously studied the proposal.

In 2004 President George W. Bush received all but one of the 40 votes cast on the island. The remaining vote was cast for Green Party nominee David Cobb. Fifty-one registered voters did not cast ballots. In 2006 Dan Akaka received 60% of votes in the 2006 Senate election to Cynthia Thielen's 36%. In 2008, Niihau's precinct was one of only 3 of Hawaii's 538 precincts to vote for John McCain over Barack Obama. McCain received 35 votes, Obama received 4, and Cynthia McKinney received 1. In the 2016 presidential election, 34 votes were cast for president, of which 20 were for Donald Trump and 10 for Hillary Clinton. In 2020, Donald Trump won 43 out of the 43 ballots cast in Niihau against Joe Biden.

Population

The 2010 census states that there were 170 people living on the island. However, witness accounts estimate that the population actually ranges between 35 and 50 people. Some support themselves largely by subsistence fishing and farming, while others depend on welfare. All residents live rent-free, and meat is free. Niihau has no telephone services and no paved roads. Horses are the main form of transportation; bicycles are also used. There are no power lines; solar power provides all electricity. There is no plumbing or running water on the island. Water comes from rainwater catchment. The Robinson family established most of these conditions. There is no hotel, and barges deliver groceries from Kauai, often purchased by relatives, with free shipping.

Residents generally speak the Niihau dialect of Hawaiian as their first language, in part encouraged by terms in the original purchase contract which obligated the new owners to help preserve Hawaiian culture and tradition. Niihau is the only island where Hawaiian is spoken as a primary language. English is the second language.

Some residents have radio and television sets, although limited reception effectively limits the latter to watching pre-recorded media. Niihau is subject to regular droughts that occasionally force the population to evacuate to Kauai temporarily, until rainfall replenishes their water supply. Residents commonly also commute to Kauai for work, medical care, or school, and many of them call both islands home. To avoid a long boat ride, the island's owners maintain an Agusta A109 helicopter for emergencies and for transporting Navy contractors and residents to and from Kauai. Helicopter tours and safaris help offset the costs of this service.

A form of ipu art is known to have developed solely on the island of Niihau. In this method, after a design is carved in the skin of a fresh gourd, it is filled with dye which, after several weeks, changes the color of the uncarved portions of the surface where the skin is intact. Hawaiian music plays a central role on the island, with a cappella singers making use of only two or three tones and changing rhythms. Ukulele and guitar playing is nearly ubiquitous among the islanders, and there are three separate styles of slack-key music, with an older style originating from Kohala.

Education
The Hawaii Department of Education operates the Niihau School, a K-12 school. Academic subjects and computer literacy are combined with teaching students to "thrive from the land". The school is powered entirely by solar power. The number of students varies from 25 to 50 since families often travel between Niihau and Kauai. Schoolchildren may stay with relatives in west Kauai, where they attend one of two Niihau-focused public charter schools. At the Ke Kula Niihau o Kekaha school, students speak primarily the Niihau dialect through the early elementary grades, and then Hawaiian and English through grade 12. The school has a digital recording and video system, which helps to preserve and teach traditional Niihau and Hawaiian culture. At the other west Kauai school, Kula Aupuni Niihau a Kahelelani Aloha (KANAKA), English is used in all grades, while still supporting the Niihau dialect. Both schools foster the culture, values, and spirituality of Niihau. Efforts to establish KANAKA began in 1993 and its current version was established in 1999.

Economy
Approximately 80% of Niihau's income comes from a small Navy installation atop 1,300-foot-high cliffs. Remote-controlled tracking devices are used for testing and training with Kaua'i's Pacific Missile Range Facility. Modern missile defense tests are conducted at the site for the U.S. and its allies. The installation brings in millions of dollars a year, and provides the island with a stable economic base without the complexity of tourism or industrial development.

The sale of shells and shell jewelry is an additional source of income. Its beaches are known for their pūpū, tiny shells that wash onto shore during winter months. Species used for shell leis includes momi (Euplica varians), laiki or rice shells (Mitrella margarita) and kahelelani (Leptothyra verruca). The shells and jewelry are so popular that Governor Linda Lingle signed a bill in 2004 to protect lei pūpū o Niihau (Niihau shell leis) from counterfeiting. A single, intricate Niihau shell lei can sell for thousands of dollars.

Many residents of Niihau were once employees of Niihau Ranch, farming cattle and sheep until the Robinsons shut down the operation in 1999. It had not been profitable for most of the 20th century. Honey cultivation was also no longer viable by 1999. Kiawe charcoal was once a large-scale export, but aggressive Mexican price competition ended that as well. Mullet farming has been popular on Niihau, with ponds and lakes stocked with baby mullet, which reach  apiece before being harvested and sold on Kauai and Oahu.

Bruce Robinson, Niihau's co-owner, is seeking and considering new forms of non-invasive income generation. Depending on feasibility, impact, and ecological footprint on the ecosystem and culture, possibilities include: JP-8 generation by the lignocellulose process; military, including a possible runway; and windmill energy production. Robinson has declined offers to purchase sand from Niihau's beaches, because of adverse environmental effects.

Tourism
Niihau's owners have offered half-day helicopter and beach tours of the island since 1987, although contact with residents is avoided and no accommodation exists. Since 1992, hunting safaris provide income via tourists who pay to visit the island to hunt eland, aoudad, and oryx, as well as wild sheep and boars. Any meat the hunters do not take with them is given to the village.

In popular culture
 The final missions of the campaigns in the 2007 real-time strategy video game Supreme Commander and its expansion, Supreme Commander: Forged Alliance take place on Niihau, which houses a superweapon installation named Black Sun. The island is roughly portrayed correctly, and the missions also feature several fictitious islands around the island of Niihau itself.
 The Niʻihau Incident is portrayed in the 2019 film Enemy Within.

References

Further reading

 
Islands of Hawaii
Volcanoes of Hawaii
Geography of Kauai County, Hawaii
Extinct volcanoes
Hawaiian–Emperor seamount chain
Private islands of the United States
Pliocene volcanoes
Neogene Oceania
Cenozoic Hawaii
Private islands of Oceania